Prorophora afghanella is a species of snout moth. It is found in Pakistan.

References

Phycitinae
Moths described in 1973